The St. Louis Cardinals 1993 season was the team's 112th season in St. Louis, Missouri and the 102nd season in the National League.  Under their manager Joe Torre, the Cardinals went 87-75 during the season (their best record in the Torre era) and finished 3rd in the National League East Division, ten games behind the NL Champion Philadelphia Phillies.  This was the final season in the NL East for the Cardinals, before their move to the NL Central for the following season.

Offseason
December 7, 1992: Rex Hudler was released by the St. Louis Cardinals.
February 22, 1993: Félix José and Craig Wilson were traded by the Cardinals to the Kansas City Royals for Gregg Jefferies and Ed Gerald (minors).

Regular season
Reliever Lee Smith became baseball's all-time saves leader this year, which has since been surpassed.

On September 7 at Riverfront Stadium, Mark Whiten hit four massive home runs and had twelve runs batted in against the Cincinnati Reds. In the process, Whiten tied two Major League records in one game.

Gregg Jeffries finished third in the NL in batting (.342) and stole 46 bases, a club record for a first baseman.

Notable Transactions
March 31, 1993: Mark Clark and Juan Andújar (minors) were traded by the Cardinals to the Cleveland Indians for Mark Whiten.
June 3, 1993: Alan Benes was drafted by the Cardinals in the 1st round (16th pick) of the 1993 amateur draft. Player signed July 19, 1993.
August 31, 1993: Lee Smith was traded by the Cardinals to the New York Yankees for Rich Batchelor.

Opening Day starters
 Bernard Gilkey
 Gregg Jefferies
 Ray Lankford
 Tom Pagnozzi
 Gerónimo Peña
 Ozzie Smith
 Bob Tewksbury
 Mark Whiten
 Todd Zeile

Season standings

Record vs. opponents

Roster

Player stats

Batting

Starters by position
Note: Pos = Position; G = Games played; AB = At bats; H = Hits; Avg. = Batting average; HR = Home runs; RBI = Runs batted in

Other batters
Note: G = Games played; AB = At bats; H = Hits; Avg. = Batting average; HR = Home runs; RBI = Runs batted in

Pitching

Starting pitchers
Note; G = Games pitched, IP = Innings pitched, W = Wins, L = Losses, ERA = Earned run average, SO = Strikeouts

Other pitchers
Note; G = Games pitched, IP = Innings pitched, W = Wins, L = Losses, ERA = Earned run average, SO = Strikeouts

Relief pitchers
Note; G = Games pitched, W = Wins, L = Losses, SV = Saves, ERA = Earned run average, SO = Strikeouts

Farm system

LEAGUE CHAMPIONS: Savannah

References

External links
1993 St. Louis Cardinals at Baseball Reference
1993 St. Louis Cardinals team page at www.baseball-almanac.com

St. Louis Cardinals seasons
St Lou